Sadíqova Sara Ğärif qızı (pronounced )  Sara Sadíqova; Tatar Cyrillic: Садыйкова Сара Гариф кызы; ; 1 November 1906 – 7 June 1986) was a Tatar actress, singer (soprano), and composer. Honoured Artist of Tatar ASSR (1937), People's Artist of Tatar ASSR (1977), Honoured Worker of Culture of the Russian SFSR (1984). In 1938–1948 she was a soloist of Musa Cälil Tatar Opera and Ballet Theatre. Sara performed parts in operas and musical comedies including Saniä, Qaçqın (Runaway), Ğäliäbanu, Başmağım (My Slippers), İldar, musical dramas On Qandır, The Employer. She is an author both of many song and musical comedies Mäxäbbät cırı (The Song of Love) (1971), and Kiäwlär (Sons-in-law) (1972) in collaboration with R. Ğöbäydullin. Sara Sadíqova is a laureate of the Ğabdulla Tuqay Tatar ASSR State Prize (1990, after her death).

She was born as Bibisara Sadíqova on November 1, 1906 in Kazan, Russian Empire. She graduated from a famous school for girls and entered teachers' training college.

In 1921 Bibisara performed her first part in the musical charity performance Buydaq (The Bachelor). One of the college's teachers, Tatar composer Soltan Ğäbäşi, sent her to the Moscow Conservatory, where she studied from 1922–1928. In 1934–1938 she worked at the Tatar Opera Studio within Moscow Conservatory.

In 1930–1934 Sara Sadíqova worked in the troupe of the Tatar Academic Theater. She performed one of the first Tatar operas Eşçe (The Worker) in the 1930s.

In 1942 Sara started to compose songs, creating the tango The Expectation on lyrics of A. Yerikeyev. Her favorite styles were the tango and foxtrot. She composed more than 400 popular songs as well as music for 30 plays.

Sara Sadíqova died on 7 June 1986 and was buried at the Memorial Yaña-Tatar Bistäse (Novotatarskoye) cemetery.

See also
 Salamat Sadikova

References and notes

External links
 Sara Sadíqova

1906 births
1986 deaths
Musicians from Kazan
Soviet composers
Tatar people of the Soviet Union
Tatar musicians
Soviet sopranos
20th-century women composers
Moscow Conservatory alumni
Soviet women opera singers
Actors from Kazan